Flosculariidae is a family of rotifers belonging to the order Flosculariaceae.

Genera:
 Beauchampia Harring, 1913
 Floscularia Cuvier, 1798
 Lacinularia Schweigger, 1826
 Lacinularoides Meksuwan, Pholpunthin & Segers, 2011
 Limnias Schrank, 1803
 Octotrocha Thorpe, 1893
 Pentatrocha Segers & Shiel, 2008
 Ptygura Ehrenberg, 1832
 Sinantherina Bory de St.Vincent, 1826

References

 
Flosculariaceae
Rotifer families